DAU is a 2019 Russian film of the DAU project organised by Ilya Khrzhanovsky. The film deals with the life of the Nobel Prize-winning Soviet scientist Lev Landau. The premiere in Paris on 25 January 2019 was in the form of a dozen feature films screened inside an extensive around-the-clock immersive installation. The film is one of Russia's largest and most controversial cinematic projects.

An eventual conventional cinematic release of a single feature film is also planned, as are documentaries and a television series.

Cast 
Teodor Currentzis, a Greek classical conductor, plays the title role of Dau while Radmila Shchegoleva, the only professional actor in the major cast, plays his wife. Alexei Blinov, technical development lead for the feature film, also acts in it as Prof. Blinov.

The cast also included: Gerard Depardieu, Anatoly Vasiliev, Dmitry Chernyakov, Olga Shkabarnya, Peter Sellars, Romeo Castellucci, Adin Steinsaltz, Carsten Höller, Marina Abramović, David Gross, Shing-Tung Yau, Nikita Nekrasov, Carlo Rovelli, James Fallon, Willem Dafoe, Charlotte Rampling, and others.

Production 
The preparation for the shooting for the film began in 2006, whereas the actual shooting started in 2008 and went on for three years. In 2017, The Daily Telegraph reported that the film was still being edited and the production company was quoted as saying, 

The film was shot at various sites in Azerbaijan, Russia, Ukraine, Germany, United Kingdom and Denmark. Most of the film was shot on a specially constructed set called "The Institute" in Kharkiv in northeastern Ukraine. The institute was the largest film set in Europe, the area totalling 12,000 m2. The set was a dynamic creative reconstruction of a Soviet restricted-access Institute in 1938–1968, located in Moscow. The filming included performances by multiple personalities, including Russian neo-Nazi leader Maxim Martsinkevich. Some actors lived in The Institute in character 24 hours a day. The destruction of the set became an integral part of the story and was shot on 8 November 2011.

Release 

The release was scheduled for October 2018 in Berlin (with similar happenings following in Paris and London) as a month-long, full time operating, immersive art installation, featuring a replica of the Berlin Wall. The city ultimately did not approve the plans, as there was too little time for authorities to check for safety for an event of these proportions, with the production company having submitted the plans less than a month prior to the event.

The project finally premiered in Paris on 25 January 2019 in the form of 12 separate feature films screened inside an installation evoking The Institute and spanning the Centre Pompidou and two municipal theaters, the Théâtre du Châtelet and the Théâtre de la Ville. Instead of tickets, entry is by "visas" of 6 hours, 24 hours or an unlimited duration. In the latter two cases, the visit is personalized according to a psychometric questionnaire which the visitor is requested to fill on registration. Audiences walk into an intermediary space, halfway between ruins and a theater set that is both contemporary and Soviet. From dusk to dawn, the three sites are linked in the sky by the Red Triangle, a light sculpture inspired by the Russian avant-garde of the early 20th century. Additional presentations are planned in London and Berlin. In April 2020, the first two films in the series were released for paid online viewing, with an additional twelve films listed on the official website.

Tablet magazine critic Vladislav Davidzon wrote that with the massive immersive theater project "Khrzhanovsky has built a testament to a great film that will never be—and could never be. DAU is a massive success as a feat of will, but a massive failure of artistry and craftsmanship."

Berlinale premiere controversy 
Prior to DAU. Natasha screening at the Berlin International Film Festival a group of Russian film critics published an open letter to festival leadership, questioning the ethical side of film's participation in Berlinale's competition program citing allegations of violence, both psychological and physical, towards cast members during the making of the film.

See also
 DAU (project)
 DAU. Natasha

References

External links

Russian documentary films
Biographical documentary films
2019 films
Films set in Ukraine
Films set in Kharkiv
Films shot in Kharkiv